Julie Belgraver (born 4 July 2002) is a French–Dutch tennis player.

Belgraver has a career-high doubles ranking by the Women's Tennis Association (WTA) of 388, which she achieved on 31 October 2022. She has won one singles title and four doubles titles on the ITF Women's World Tennis Tour.

Belgraver made her Grand Slam debut at the 2019 French Open, after receiving a wildcard for the doubles main draw, partnering Mylène Halemai.

Grand Slam performance timeline

Singles

Doubles

ITF finals

Singles: 2 (1 title, 1 runner–up)

Doubles: 7 (4 titles, 3 runner–ups)

References

External links
 
 

2002 births
Living people
French female tennis players
Dutch female tennis players